Dulan (Dulaan) is a rural locality (a selo) in Kabansky District, Republic of Buryatia, Russia. The population was 132 as of 2010. There are 9 streets.

Geography 
Dulan is located 69 km north of Kabansk (the district's administrative centre) by road. Oymur is the nearest rural locality.

References 

Rural localities in Kabansky District
Populated places on Lake Baikal